The Alpial is a Rajputs tribe found in the Rawalpindi and Attock Districts of Pakistani Punjab.

Bibliography

References 

Gurjar